Patricia A. Dunn-Luoma (born April 25, 1974) is an American ice hockey player. She won a gold medal at the 1998 Winter Olympics, silver medal at the 2002 Winter Olympics and a bronze medal at the 2006 Winter Olympics. She graduated from Pinkerton Academy in Derry, and the University of New Hampshire in 1996.

See also
New Hampshire Historical Marker No. 266: Pinkerton Academy / Old Academy Building

References

External links
Tricia Dunn-Luoma's U.S. Olympic Team bio

1974 births
Living people
American women's ice hockey forwards
Ice hockey people from New Hampshire
Ice hockey players at the 1998 Winter Olympics
Ice hockey players at the 2002 Winter Olympics
Ice hockey players at the 2006 Winter Olympics
Medalists at the 1998 Winter Olympics
Medalists at the 2002 Winter Olympics
Medalists at the 2006 Winter Olympics
Olympic gold medalists for the United States in ice hockey
Olympic silver medalists for the United States in ice hockey
Olympic bronze medalists for the United States in ice hockey
People from Derry, New Hampshire
New Hampshire Wildcats women's ice hockey players
Pinkerton Academy alumni
Sportspeople from Rockingham County, New Hampshire